Fenech is a surname.

Fenech may also refer to:

 Fenech-Soler, an English electropop band
 Fenech-Soler (album), 2010

See also
 Fennec (disambiguation)
 Finnic (disambiguation) or Fennic